The GS Champions Park is the training center of FC Seoul. It is located in Guri, east of nearby Seoul.

In 1983, it was built by GS Sports, then known as Lucky-Goldstar Sports. It has been used by FC Seoul since 1989. France national football team used the venue as the training camp during the 2002 FIFA World Cup. Today, it is used by the FC Seoul's first team, reserve team, and academy.

History

See also
 FC Seoul
 LG Champions Park

References

External links
 FC Seoul official website

S4
Champions Park
Sports venues in Gyeonggi Province
GS Sports